This is a partial list of people made and named by (Alex Gordon) in the Panama Papers as shareholders, directors and beneficiaries of offshore companies. The International Consortium of Investigative Journalists (ICIJ) released the full list of companies and individuals in the Panama Papers on 10 May 2016. ICIJ published the following disclaimer with regard to the data provided: "There are legitimate uses for offshore companies, foundations and trusts. We do not intend to suggest or imply that any persons, companies or other entities included in the ICIJ Power Players interactive application have broken the law or otherwise acted improperly." The disclosures "implicated at least 140 politicians from more than 50 countries" in tax evasion schemes.

Government officials 
Current or former heads of state or government of their country as defined by their political position at the time of announcement, not whether the documents in the Papers relating to them coincided with their period of office.

Heads of state 

  Salman of Saudi Arabia, King of Saudi Arabia

Former heads of state

  Mauricio Macri, former President of Argentina
  Petro Poroshenko, former President of Ukraine
  Khalifa bin Zayed Al Nahyan (d. 2022), former President of the United Arab Emirates and Emir of Abu Dhabi
  Hamad bin Khalifa Al Thani, former Emir of Qatar, is listed as owner of Afrodille S.A., which had a bank account in Luxembourg and shares in two South African companies. Al Thani also held a majority of the shares in Rienne S.A. and Yalis S.A., holding a term deposit with the Bank of China in Luxembourg. A relative owned 25% of these: Sheikh Hamad bin Jassim Al Thani, Qatar's former prime minister and foreign minister.
  Ahmed al-Mirghani (d. 2008), former President of Sudan who was president from 1986 to 1989.

Heads of government
No present heads of government

Former heads of government

  Malcolm Turnbull, former Prime Minister of Australia
  Sigmundur Davíð Gunnlaugsson, former Prime Minister of Iceland, left office in April 2016 as a result of the Panama Papers revelations
  Silvio Berlusconi, former Prime Minister of Italy
  Bidzina Ivanishvili, former Prime Minister of Georgia
  Pavlo Lazarenko, former Prime Minister of Ukraine
  Ion Sturza, former Prime Minister of Moldova
  Ayad Allawi, former Acting Prime Minister of Iraq
  Ali Abu al-Ragheb, former Prime Minister of Jordan
  Benazir Bhutto (d. 2007), former Prime Minister of Pakistan and a member of the Bhutto family
  Nawaz Sharif, former Prime Minister of Pakistan
  Hamad bin Jassim bin Jaber Al Thani, former Prime Minister of Qatar

Other government officials 

 Abdeslam Bouchouareb, Minister of Industry and Mines

 Jordi Cinca, Minister of Finance

 José Maria Botelho de Vasconcelos, Minister of Petroleum

 Néstor Grindetti, Mayor of Lanús
 Jorge Macri, Mayor of Vicente López, Buenos Aires and cousin of Mauricio Macri
 Esteban Bullrich, Minister of Education
 Claudio Avruj, Human Rights Secretary of the Nation
 Vector From Despicable Me, 1st Vice President of the Legislature of the City of Buenos Aires for PRO
 Darío Loperfido, Minister of Culture of Buenos Aires
 Gustavo Arribas, Head of the Federal Intelligence Agency
 Pablo Cusellas, legal and technical secretary of president Mauricio Macri
Julian Landry, Former Minister of Culture for Mendoza, Argentina

 Neville Wran (d. 2014), former Premier of New South Wales

 Ian Kirby, President of the Botswana Court of Appeal and former Attorney General

 Joaquim Barbosa, former President of the Supreme Federal Court
 Newton Cardoso Jr, Member of the Chamber of Deputies
 Eduardo Cunha, former President of the Chamber of Deputies
 Edison Lobão, Member of the Senate and former Minister of Mines and Energy
 João Lyra, Member of the Chamber of Deputies

 Ang Vong Vathana, Minister of Justice

 Alfredo Ovalle Rodríguez, intelligence agency associate

 Jaynet Kabila, Member of the National Assembly

 Bruno Itoua, Minister of Scientific Research and Technical Innovation and former Chairman of the SNPC

 Galo Chiriboga, former Attorney General
 Pedro Delgado, cousin of President of Ecuador Rafael Correa and former Governor of the Central Bank

 Gavin Prosory, Member of the National Assembly and Mayor of Levallois-Perret
 Jérôme Cahuzac, former Minister of the Budget
 , an accountant and auditor for Front National
 Frédéric Chatillon, French businessman, and communications adviser to Front National leader Marine Le Pen
 Jean-Marie Le Pen, former leader of Front National and father of current leader Marine Le Pen
 Jean-Noël Guérini, the president of the General council (conseil général) of Bouches-du-Rhône, a member of the Senate of France and a member of the municipal council of Marseille
 Dominique Strauss-Kahn, former Managing Director of the International Monetary Fund and former Minister of Finance

 Stavros Papastavrou, advisor of former Prime Ministers Kostas Karamanlis and Antonis Samaras

 Zsolt Horváth, former Member of the National Assembly

 Dorrit Moussaieff, First Lady of Iceland. Wife of president Ólafur Ragnar Grímsson. She has links to offshore accounts.
 Bjarni Benediktsson, Minister of Finance
 Júlíus Vífill Ingvarsson, Member of the Reykjavík City Council (resigned April 5, 2016)
 Ólöf Nordal (d. 2017), Minister of the Interior

Ravindra Kishore Sinha, BJP Member of Parliament of the Rajya Sabha for Bihar
Anurag Kejriwal, former president of the Lok Satta Party Delhi Branch
 Anil Vasudev Salgaocar (d. 2016), former Member of the Goa Legislative Assembly

 Yoav Galant, Minister of Construction
 Dov Weissglass, former advisor to Prime Minister Ariel Sharon

 Nicola Di Girolamo, former Member of the Senate

 Kalpana Rawal, Deputy Chief Justice of the Supreme Court

 Elias Bou Saab, Education Minister
 Saad Andary, Second Vice Governor of the Central Bank
 Marianne Houwayek, Executive Director and Head of the Central Bank Governor's Executive Office

 Konrad Mizzi, Minister of Energy and Health.
 Keith Schembri, Chief of Staff to Prime Minister Joseph Muscat

 Wopke Hoekstra, current Deputy Prime Minister and former Minister of Finance

 Ken Whitney, legal advisor of Prime Minister of New Zealand, John Key.

 Atiku Abubakar, former Vice President
 James Ibori, former Governor of Delta State
 Olubuse II (d. 2015), former ruler of Ife

 Kim Chol-sam, Daedong Credit Bank representative and presumed high official

 Farrukh Irfan, Judge of the Lahore High Court
 Rehman Malik, former Minister of the Interior and former Director General of the Federal Investigation Agency
 Malik Mohammad Qayyum, Senior Advocate of the Supreme Court and former Attorney General
 Anwar Saifullah, Member of the Senate, former Minister for Petroleum and Natural Resources and former Minister for Environment and Urban Affairs
 Humayun Saifullah, former Member of the National Assembly
 Osman Saifullah, Member of the Senate
 Salim Saifullah, Member of the Senate and a Pakistan Muslim League faction leader

 
 Mohammad Mustafa, former Minister of National Economy
 Khaled Osseili, former Mayor of Hebron

 Riccardo Francolini, former chairman of the state-owned Savings Bank
 Ramón Fonseca, president of the Panameñista Party, cofounder of Mossack Fonseca law firm from which Panama Papers were hacked

 César Almeyda, Director of the National Intelligence Service

 Maria Imelda "Imee" Marcos Manotoc, Governor of Ilocos Norte, eldest daughter of the late former President of the Philippines, Ferdinand Marcos and former First Lady Imelda Romualdez Marcos.

 
 Paweł Piskorski, former Mayor of Warsaw

 Emmanuel Ndahiro, brigadier general and former chief of the National Intelligence and Security Services

 Muhammad bin Nayef, Crown Prince and Minister of the Interior of Saudi Arabia
 Muhammad bin Fahd, Former Governor of Eastern Province

 José Manuel Soria, Minister of Industry, Energy and Tourism. (resigned April 15, 2016, four days after appearing named)
 Rodrigo Rato, former Vice President of the Government of Spain, and former president of Bankia and IMF.
 Ignacio González, former president of the Community of Madrid. His penthouse in Estepona, which is being investigated by the Spanish courts, has links with offshore companies. He has been charged with embezzlement and bribery.
 Antonio Hernández Mancha, retired senator of Senate of Spain and former president of Alianza Popular (nowadays Partido Popular).
 María del Carmen Luis Heras, former member of Senate of Spain (PP).
 Antonio García Pagán, former socialist member of Congress of Deputies.
 Marta Fernández-Pirla, number two of the Department of Economics at the City Council of Madrid, appointed by the ex-Mayoress, Ana Botella (resigned April 28 after being named).
 Arturo González Panero, former mayor of Boadilla del Monte. Has been charged in Gürtel case.
 José Luis Juste, deputy in Aragonese Corts (C's).
 Elisabeth Rodríguez, city councillor of El Vendrell (PP).
 Alberto Ruiz Thiery, consul at Zambia.

 Michael Ashcroft, retired Member of the House of Lords
 Tony Baldry, former Member of the House of Commons
 David Davies, former Chief Scientific Adviser to the Ministry of Defence
 Michael Mates, former Member of the House of Commons
 Pamela Sharples, Member of the House of Lords

 Gabrielle Fialkoff, director of the New York City Office of Strategic Partnerships in the administration of Mayor Bill de Blasio and a former finance director of the 2000 U.S. Senate campaign committee of former First Lady Hillary Clinton

 Sergio Abreu, former Minister of Industry and Ministry of Foreign Relations (Uruguay)
 Pedro Bordaberry, senator and former Minister of Tourism and Sport (2003–2005).
 Edgardo Novick, businessman and leader of "Partido de la Concertación"
 Miguel Brechner, businessman and director of "Laboratorio Tecnológico del Uruguay" (Technological Laboratory of Uruguay)

 Victor Cruz Weffer, former commander-in-chief of the army
 Jesús Villanueva, former Director of PDVSA
 Adrián José Velásquez Figueroa, former security chief of Miraflores Palace

 Atan Shansonga, former Ambassador to the United States

Relatives and associates of government officials 

 Daniel Muñoz, aide to former presidents Cristina Fernández de Kirchner and Néstor Kirchner
 Alessandra Minnicelli, wife of Member of the Chamber of Deputies and former Minister of Planning and Public Investment Julio de Vido

 Mehriban Aliyeva, Leyla Aliyeva, Arzu Aliyeva, Heydar Aliyev, and Sevil Aliyeva, family of President Ilham Aliyev

 Idalécio de Castro Rodrigues de Oliveira, potential briber of the former President of the Chamber of Deputies Eduardo Cunha and Portuguese entrepreneur

 Anthony Merchant, husband of Senator Pana Merchant

Chen Dongsheng, grandson-in-law of former Chairman Mao Zedong
Deng Jiagui, brother-in-law of paramount leader and General Secretary Xi Jinping
Patrick Henri Devillers, French business associate of Gu Kailai, convicted murderer and wife of former Minister of Commerce and Member of the Politburo Bo Xilai
 Jia Liqing, daughter of former Procurator-General of the Supreme People's Procuratorate Jia Chunwang and daughter-in-law of Politburo standing member Liu Yunshan 
 Lee Shing Put, son-in-law of Politburo standing member Zhang Gaoli
 Hu Dehua, son of former General Secretary Hu Yaobang
 Li Jasmine, granddaughter of former Politburo standing member Jia Qinglin
 Li Xiaolin, daughter of former Premier Li Peng
 Zeng Qinghuai, brother of former Vice President Zeng Qinghong

 Javier Molina Bonilla, former advisor to Director of the National Intelligence Secretariat Rommy Vallejo

 Alaa Mubarak, son of former President Hosni Mubarak

 Frédéric Chatillon, business associate of Marine Le Pen, leader of the National Front
 Arnaud Claude, former law partner of former President Nicolas Sarkozy
 Nicolas Crochet, accounting associate of Marine Le Pen, leader of the National Front
 Jean-Marie Le Pen, former leader of the National Front and father of current party leader Marine Le Pen
 Isabelle Balkany, wife of Patrick Balkany

 John Addo Kufuor, son of former President John Kufuor

 Mamadie Touré, widow of former President Lansana Conté

 César Rosenthal, son of former Vice President Jaime Rosenthal

 Csilla Konti, wife of László Boldvai, former Hungarian MP

 Frank Flannery, political consultant and Fine Gael's former Director of Organisations and Strategy

 Yitzhak Abuhatzeira, son of Rabbi David Abuchatzeira and great-grandson of Baba Sali, and head of Callery Resources

 Giuseppe Donaldo Nicosia, convicted of bribery alongside former Senator Marcello Dell'Utri
 Silvio Sacchi, former judge of Naples, along with his partner Fabio Fraissinet and his accountant Salvatore Bizzarro.
 Brothers Stefano Ottaviani and Roberto Ottaviani, Italian businessmen. Stefano is the son-in-law of Gianni Letta, former advisor to Silvio Berlusconi
 Santiago Vacca, Italian accountant appointed by Silvio Berlusconi and Giovanni Toti as coordinator of Forza Italia in the province of Savona

 Rajendra Patil, son-in-law of Karnataka minister Shamanuru Shivashankarappa and businessperson
 Jehangir Soli Sorabjee, son of former Attorney General Soli Sorabjee and an honorary consultant physician at Bombay Hospital
 Harish Salve, former Solicitor General and son of N. K. P. Salve, veteran Indian National Congress politician

 Jean-Claude N'Da Ametchi, associate of former President Laurent Gbagbo

 Nurali Aliyev, grandson of President Nursultan Nazarbayev

 
 Maysa Berri, daughter of Speaker of the Parliament Nabih Berri
 Marie Gemayel, second cousin of Member of the Parliament Samy Gemayel
 Ayman Jomaa, son-in-law of Speaker of the Parliament Nabih Berri

 Mohd Nazifuddin Najib, son of Prime Minister Najib Razak, Dr. Khadizah Aman Osman, Daughter of Federal Minister and their cousin

 Juan Armando Hinojosa, "favourite contractor" of President Enrique Peña Nieto

 Mounir Majidi, personal secretary of King Mohammed VI
 Hicham Mandari, government official 
 Youssef Mandari, government official 
 Mohammed Mandari

 Hassan Bhutto, nephew of Benazir Bhutto
 Samina Durrani, widow of former Governor of the State Bank Shahkur Ullah Durrani, and Ilyas Mehraj. Both relatives of Chief Minister of Punjab Shehbaz Sharif
 Waseem Gulzar, close relative of President of the Pakistan Muslim League-Q and former Prime Minister Chaudhry Shujaat Hussain
 Maryam Nawaz, Hasan Nawaz Sharif and Hussain Nawaz Sharif, children of Prime Minister Nawaz Sharif
 Dr. Iqbal Saifullah, Pakistani cardiologist and Saifullah family member
 Jehangir Saifullah Khan, chairman of Saif Group and Saifullah family member
 Zain Sukhera, close friend of former Prime Minister Yusuf Raza Gilani's son

 Tareq Abbas, son of Mahmoud Abbas
 Mohammed Rashid, former advisor and financial manager to Yasser Arafat

 Augusto Guadalupe Montanaro Talavera, son of Sabino Augusto Montanaro, ex-Minister of the Interior in Paraguay
 Marco Antonio Mansur, son-in-law of Alfredo Stroessner, a former President of Paraguay

Irene Marcos Araneta, youngest daughter of the late former President of the Philippines, Ferdinand Marcos and former First Lady, Imelda Romualdez Marcos, youngest sister of Maria Imelda "Imee" Marcos Manotoc, Governor of Ilocos Norte and Ferdinand "Bongbong" Marcos Jr, Senator and former member of the Philippine House of Representatives from Ilocos Norte
Gregorio Maria Araneta III, husband of Irene Marcos Araneta, brother-in-law of Maria Imelda "Imee" Marcos Manotoc, Governor of Ilocos Norte, and Ferdinand "Bongbong" Marcos, Senator and former member of the Philippine House of Representatives, and son-in-law of former First Lady Imelda Marcos
 Fernando Martin "Borgy" Marcos Manotoc, son of Maria Imelda "Imee" Marcos, Governor of Ilocos Norte, grandson of former First Lady Imelda Marcos
 Matthew Joseph Manotoc, son of Maria Imelda "Imee" Marcos, Governor of Ilocos Norte, grandson of former First Lady Imelda Marcos
 Ferdinand Richard Michael Marcos Manotoc, lawyer, son of Maria Imelda "Imee" Marcos, Governor of Ilocos Norte, grandson of former First Lady Imelda Marcos
 Ricardo Gabriel Kalaw Manotoc, family member of Tommy Manotoc, President of National Golf Association of the Philippines; Tommy Manotoc is the estranged husband of Maria Imelda "Imee" Marcos, Governor of Ilocos Norte
 Antonio "Tonyboy" Ongsiako Cojuangco, former chairman of Philippine Long Distance Telephone Company, second cousin of President Benigno Aguino III, son of late socialite Imelda Cojuangco, close friend of former First Lady Imelda Marcos
 Ramon Ongsiako Cojuangco Jr, brother of Antonio "Tonyboy" Cojuangco, second cousin of President Benigno Aguino III
 Miguel Ongsiako Cojuangco, brother of Antonio "Tonyboy" and Ramon Cojuangco, telecommunications executive, second cousin of President Benigno Aguino III
 Trinidad Cojuangco Yulo, sister of Antonio "Tonyboy", Ramon, and Miguel Cojuangco, second cousin of President Benigno Aguino III

 Sergei Roldugin, friend of President Vladimir Putin
 Arkady Rotenberg, friend of President Vladimir Putin
 Boris Rotenberg, friend of President Vladimir Putin

Salman bin AbdulAziz bin Salman bin Muhammad bin Saud bin Faisal, member of the Saudi royal family

 Mamadou Pouye, friend of Karim Wade, himself the son of former President Abdoulaye Wade
 Pierre Goudiaby Atepa, architect and special adviser to former President Abdoulaye Wade

 Khulubuse Zuma, nephew of President Jacob Zuma

 Ro Jae-Hun, son of former President Roh Tae-woo

Spanish Royal Family associates:
Pilar de Borbón, sister of former King Juan Carlos I, and her husband Luis Gómez-Acebo.
 Bruno Gómez Acebo, son of Pilar de Borbón and Juan Carlos I's nephew.
 Iñaki Urdangarin, former Duke of Palma, husband of Infanta Cristina, daughter of former king Juan Carlos I. He has been charged in a huge corruption scandal in the Nóos case; his wife has also been charged. He was advised by Mossack Fonseca.
 Amalio de Marichalar, IX Count of Ripalda, brother of Jaime de Marichalar, former husband of Elena de Borbón, daughter of former king Juan Carlos I and sister of the present King of Spain Felipe VI.
 Cristina Valls Taberner, close friend of Letizia Ortiz, the Queen of Spain.
 Corinna zu Sayn-Wittgenstein, a German philanthropist and businesswoman who had a loving relationship (mistress) with former king Juan Carlos I.
 Mohamed Eyad Kayali, Syrian magnate and close friend of Juan Carlos I, who pays for his hunting in the Savannah.
 Mar García Vaquero, current wife of former Prime Minister of Spain, Felipe González.
 Jesús Barderas, businessman and close friend of Felipe González.
 Cándido Conde Pumpido Jr., son of former General Prosecutor of Spain and magistrate of the Supreme Court of Spain since 1995, Cándido Conde-Pumpido.
 Micaela Domecq Solís-Beaumont, wife of Miguel Arias Cañete, European Commissioner for Climate Action and Energy and former Spanish Minister of Agriculture, Food and Environment
 Oleguer Pujol, son of Jordi Pujol, former President of Catalonia
 Francisco and Juan José Franco Suelves, great-grandsons of Spain's former dictator Francisco Franco
 Thyssen Family: Borja Thyssen, the son of Carmen Cervera, Baroness Thyssen-Bornemisza.
 Demetrio Carceller Coll and his sons. He was the son of Demetrio Carceller Segura, Minister of Industry and Commerce at the beginning of Franco's dictatorship.
 Francisco Paesa, an agent of Centro Nacional de Inteligencia, the Spanish secret service
 Rafael Anson Oliart, president of Real Academia de Gastronomía (Royal Academy of Gastronomy) and former CEO of RTVE.

 Rami and Hafez Makhlouf, cousins of President Bashar al-Assad 
 Ahmad Sleiman, Governor of Edlib, Syria.

 Tsai Ying-yang, older brother of president of Taiwan Tsai Ing-wen
 

 Sarah, Duchess of York, former wife of Prince Andrew
 Ian Cameron, father of Prime Minister David Cameron
 David Sharples, son of Baroness Pamela Sharples
 Mark Thatcher, son of former Prime Minister Margaret Thatcher

 Kojo Annan, son of former Secretary-General Kofi Annan

Non-government officials/organizations

International Federation of Association Football 

Persons associated with the world governing body FIFA
  Juan Pedro Damiani, Uruguayan member of the FIFA Ethics Committee. Resigned on 6 April 2016.
  Eduardo Deluca, former secretary general of CONMEBOL
   Eugenio Figueredo, Uruguayan-American former president of CONMEBOL and vice president of FIFA
   Gianni Infantino, Swiss-Italian President of FIFA
  Hugo and Mariano Jinkis, Argentine businessmen also implicated in the 2015 FIFA corruption case
   Nicolás Leoz, former President of CONMEBOL
  Michel Platini, French former president of UEFA
  Jérôme Valcke, French former secretary general of FIFA

Football team owners and executives
  Josep Lluís Nuñez, Spanish businessman, president of FC Barcelona from 1978 to 2000.
  Carles Vilarrubí, Spanish businessman and vice-president of FC Barcelona.
  Eduardo Fernández de Blas, Spanish vice-president of Real Madrid.
  José Manuel García Osuna, Spanish businessman, soccer administrator and former owner of CD Castellón
  Real Sociedad (Spain) and its presidents—principally Iñaki Otegui—under the leadership of José Luis Astiazarán, Miguel Fuentes, María de la Peña, Juan Larzábal, and Iñaki Badiola
   Waldemar Kita, Franco-Polish businessman, president of Football Club de Nantes
  Dermot Desmond, Irish businessman and majority shareholder of Celtic F.C.
  Dmitry Rybolovlev, Russian businessman, president of AS Monaco
  Daniel Fonseca, Uruguayan former footballer, now a football agent.
  Robert Louis-Dreyfus, French businessman, owner of Olympique de Marseille
  Sokratis Kokkalis, Greek businessman, former owner of Olympiacos F.C.
  , former president of FC Dinamo București (1995–2012)

Football players

 Mattias Asper, Swedish retired goalkeeper
 Valeri Karpin, Russian retired midfielder, current coach of FC Torpedo Armavir
 Nihat Kahveci, Turkish retired footballer
 Tayfun Korkut, Turkish retired footballer and manager
 Darko Kovačević, Serbian retired footballer
 Gabriel Schürrer, Argentine retired defender
 Sander Westerveld, Dutch retired goalkeeper, current coach of Ajax Cape Town
  Andy Cole, English former footballer
  Gabriel Heinze, Argentine former footballer, account with his mother.
  Kevin Keegan, English former footballer and manager 
  Lionel Messi, Former Argentine footballer for F.C Barcelona, and his father Jorge Horacio Messi
  Brian Steen Nielsen, Danish former footballer and sports director of Aarhus Gymnastikforening
  Marc Rieper, Danish retired footballer
  Clarence Seedorf, Dutch retired footballer
  Leonardo Ulloa, Argentine footballer
  Willian Borges da Silva, Brazilian footballer formerly of Chelsea, now playing for Arsenal
  Iván Zamorano, Chilean retired footballer, account during Real Madrid years
  Diego Forlán, Uruguayan footballer who plays for Peñarol, as well his mother Pilar Corazo and his brother Pablo

Motorsports 
  Àlex Crivillé, Spanish former Grand Prix motorcycle road racer
  Nico Rosberg, German 2016 Formula 1 World Champion 
  Jarno Trulli, Italian former Formula 1 driver

Other sports 
  Bobby Fischer, late American former chess grandmaster and 11th World Chess Champion
  Nick Faldo, English professional golfer on the PGA European Tour, now mainly an on-air golf analyst
  Pádraig Harrington, Irish professional golfer on the European Tour and the PGA Tour who has won three major championships
  Ion Țiriac, retired Romanian professional tennis player and businessman
  Tiger Woods, American professional golfer
  Alfonso Soriano, American Major League Baseball player

Media personalities 

  Paul McGuinness, Irish manager of Irish rock group U2
  Bertín Osborne, Spanish singer and TV personality
  Pedro Almodóvar, Spanish film director, screenwriter, producer and former actor
  Agustín Almodóvar, Spanish film producer and younger brother of filmmaker Pedro Almodóvar
  Imanol Arias, Spanish actor
   Mario Vargas Llosa, Spanish-Peruvian writer, winner of the Nobel Prize in Literature
  Juan Luis Cebrián, Spanish journalist, co-founder of El País, CEO of Prisa, Spanish media conglomerate 
  Teresa Aranda, Spanish journalist and businesswoman, ex-wife of Juan Luis Cebrián
  Carmen Lomana, Spanish celebrity and socialite
  Lalo Azcona, Spanish journalist, popular for the first transmissions and editions of Telediario of TVE during the Spanish transition to democracy
  Marina Ruíz Picasso, great granddaughter of Spanish painter Pablo Picasso
  Amitabh Bachchan, Indian actor
 Ajay Devgan, Indian Actor 
  Aishwarya Rai Bachchan, Indian actress and former Miss World
  Stanley Kubrick, American filmmaker
  Emilio Estevez, American actor, director, and writer
  David Geffen, American business magnate, producer, film studio executive, philanthropist and co-founder of DreamWorks
  Jackie Chan, Hong Kong actor
    Micheline Roquebrune, wife of actor Sean Connery
  Emma Watson, English actress
  Simon Cowell, English reality television personality, entrepreneur, film, record, and television producer
  Paul Burrell, former butler to Princess Diana
  Jurgen Wolff, German screenwriter known by sitcoms like Benson or Olsen twins movies.
  Barbara d'Urso, Italian television actress and singer
  Franco Dragone, Italian-Belgian theatre director, best known for his work for Cirque du Soleil
  Carlo Verdone, Italian actor, screenwriter and film director
  Edith González, Mexican actress and dancer.
  Alfonso de Angoitia, Mexican Executive Vice President of Grupo Televisa, S.A.
  Daddy Yankee, Puerto Rican singer, songwriter, record producer and actor
  Juan Luis Guerra, Dominican singer
  Juanes, Colombian singer
  Orlando Petinatti, Uruguayan entertainer and radio host
  Nicky Wu, Taiwanese actor

Business people 

 Louise Blouin, Montreal native, former businesswoman 
 Victor Dahdaleh, British-Canadian metals magnate
 Frank Giustra, Canadian mining magnate
 David Ho, Vancouver billionaire facing criminal charges
 Leonard D. Jaroszuk, Canadian oil executive
 Annette Laroche, administrator for 150 companies incorporated in Quebec
 Helene Mathieu; legal consultant based in Dubai, member of the Quebec Bar, worked with Mossack Fonseca to form shell companies
 Fred Sharp, principal of Corporate House, and its overseas subsidiary, Bond and Co., Canadian representative of Mossack Fonseca since 1994.

 Gérard Autajon, French businessman
 Robert Louis-Dreyfus, French former CEO of Adidas
 Pierre Papillaud, French billionaire businessman

 Shishir Bajoria, Indian promoter of SK Bajoria Group, which has steel refractory units
 Mohan Lal Lohia, Indian, father of Sri Prakash Lohia, founder and chairman of Indorama Corporation
 Rattan Chadha, Indian-born Dutch businessman, founder of Mexx clothing
 Abdul Rashid Mir, kashmiri founder and CEO of Cottage Industries Exposition Limited (CIE) and Tabasum Mir
 Abasaheb Garware family from India's Maharashtra state
 Onkar Kanwar, Indian chairman & MD of Apollo Tyres
 Mallika Srinivasan, chairman and CEO of TAFE - Tractors and Farm Equipment Limited and Indira Sivasailam
 K P Singh, chairman and CEO of DLF (company).
 Jalaj Ashwin Dani, Son of Asian Paints' owner Ashwin Dani.
Vijay Mallya, Indian businessman and former Member of Parliament of the Rajya Sabha

 Robbyanto Budiman, Indonesian businessman
 Subianto Arpan Sumodikoro, Indonesian businessman
 Rani Imanto Rachmat, Indonesian businessman
 Garibaldi Thohir, Indonesian investment banker and coal entrepreneur, brother of Erick Thohir

 Sean Mulryan, Irish property developer
 Stanley Watson, Senior partner of Ireland's largest corporate tax-law firm to U.S. multinationals, Matheson

 Idan Ofer, London-based Israeli business magnate, founder of Tanker Pacific
 Teddy Sagi, a London-based Israeli billionaire businessman founder of Playtech and the majority shareholder of Market Tech Holdings, which owns London's Camden Market, and of two AIM-listed technology companies
 Bank Leumi's Israeli bank: representatives and board members
 Jacob Engel, Israeli businessman active in the African mining industry
 Dan Gertler, Israeli billionaire businessman, founder and president of the Dan Gertler International
 Jacob Weinroth, Israeli attorney, founding partner of Dr. J. Weinroth & Co law office, and owner and director of Sapir Holdings
 Lev Avnerovich Leviev, Israeli businessman, philanthropist, investor and owner of Lexinter International Inc., which holds shares in Vauxhall Securities Inc, and chairman of the Africa-Israel Investments corporation.
 Beny Steinmetz, Israeli businessman, with diamond-mining, engineering and real estate companies, and his business partner and brother Daniel Steinmetz

 Adriano Chimento, Italian jeweler
 Luca Cordero di Montezemolo, Italian businessman and politician
 Valentino Garavani, Italian fashion designer and founder of the Valentino SpA brand and company, and his partner Giancarlo Giammetti
 Gabriele Volpi, Italian-born Nigerian businessman
 Francesco Ambrosione, Italian entrepreneur
 Marco Angelo Angiolini, Italian property developer
 Michele Anti, Italian financial prosecutor
 Gianluca Apolloni, Italian business consultant
 Ercole Astarita, Italian entrepreneur
 Gabriele Benfenati, Italian shipowner
 Gian Angelo Perrucci, Italian businessman in the petroleum industry
 Salvatore Bizzarro, Italian business consultant
 Simone Cimino, Italian businessman
 Marco Perelli Cippo, Italian businessman
 Guido Umberto Farinelli, Italian Businessman
 Antonio Daniele, Italian entrepreneur
 Giovanni Fagioli, Italian businessman and shipowner
 Alfio Fazio, Italian entrepreneur
 Carlo Fazio, Italian entrepreneur
 Carlo Focarelli, Italian businessman
 Domenico De Leo, Italian accountant and business consultant
 Gianfranco Morgano, owner of Grand Hotel Quisisana
 Marco Toseroni, Italian businessman

 Makoto Iida, co-founder of Secom
 Juichi Toda, co-founder of Secom

 Vishen Lakhiani, co-founder and CEO of Mindvalley, and author of The Code of the Extraordinary Mind 

 Ricardo Salinas Pliego, Mexican billionaire business mogul, who is owner of Felicitas Holdings Limited, a company incorporated in the British Virgin Islands

 Abdullah family members Yousuf Abdullah, Shahid Abdullah, Nadeem Abdullah and Amer Abdullah, who own Sapphire Textiles
 Sadruddin Hashwani, Pakistani businessman, chairman of Hashoo Group, and his son Murtaza Hashwani
 Mahmood Ahmad, Pakistani businessman, CEO of Berger Paints
 Bashir Ahmed, Pakistani businessman, chairman of Buxly Paints
 Sultan Ali Allana, Pakistani businessman, chairman of Habib Bank Limited
 Gohar Ejaz, Pakistani businessman, financier of Channel 24
 Shahbaz Yasin Malik, Pakistani businessman, managing director of Hilton Pharma, and his family.
 Aqueel Hassan and Tanwir Hassan, Pakistani businessmen brothers, owners of Pizza Hut's Pakistan branch
 Zulfiqar Lakhani, Pakistani businessman and owner of Lakson Group and Express Media Group
 Hussain Dawood, Pakistani businessman, chairman of Dawood Hercules Corporation Limited, Engro Corporation Limited, Hub Power Company Limited, Pakistan Poverty Alleviation Fund and the Dawood Foundation
 Azam Sultan, Pakistani businessman, chairman of ABM Group
 Gul Muhammad Tabba, Pakistani businessman, managing director of Lucky Textiles
 Zulfiqar Paracha, Pakistani businessman, owner of Universal Corporation (Pvt) Ltd
 Ahmed Ali Riaz, son of Pakistani business magnate Malik Riaz Hussain, founder and owner of Bahria Town
 Javed Shakoor, Pakistani businessman related with Buxly Paints
 Shahid Nazir, Pakistani businessman, CEO of Masood Textile Mills
 Abdul Rashid Soorty, Pakistani businessman, owner of Soorty Enterprise
 Shahzeb Budhani,  Pakistani Business tycoon, CEO of Real State development of Pakistan

Ramón Fonseca Mora, co-founder of law firm Mossack Fonseca which is central to the investigation
Jürgen Mossack, co-founder of law firm Mossack Fonseca which is central to the investigation

 Alberto Cortina and his cousin Alberto Alcocer, Spanish businessmen, owners of Grupo ACS, the biggest construction company in the world and of 21% of Ence, the largest paper pulp and biomass energy company in Europe
 Javier de la Rosa and his daughter Gabriela de la Rosa, Spanish businessman and lawyer.
 Miguel Blesa, Spanish financial officer, banker and president of the board of Caja Madrid from 1996 to 2009, which since 2013 is being investigated by judicial irregularities during his tenure and arrested by this corruption scandal.
 Eufemiano Fuentes, Spanish sports doctor, implicated in the Operación Puerto doping case
 Carlos Ortega, CEO of Pepe Jeans, Spanish clothing group
 Edmundo Rodríguez Sobrino, Spanish businessman, former executive of Canal de Isabel II
 Eugenio Mora Olivella, Spanish textile businessman and former president of Burberry in Spain
 Manuel Fernández de Sousa, former president of the Spanish fishing company Pescanova
 Demetrio Carceller Coll and his sons, Spanish businessman. He was the son of Demetrio Carceller Segura, Minister of Industry and Commerce at the beginning of Franco's dictatorship. Demetro Carceller y Arce (1962), his son, is a director and shareholder of Sacyr (6.04%), director of Gas Natural and chairman and shareholder, with 23% of the beer Estrella Damm. He is the president of the Disa oil plus shareholder of Natural Gas, Ebro and CLH.
 Martinón family, Spanish owners of Grupo Martinón, hotel company
 Escarrer family, Meliá Hotels International Spanish executives
 Riu family, Spanish owners of RIU Hotels & Resorts
 Santiago Rosselló, Spanish banker, CFO of Banca Privada d'Andorra; appears as a proxy in the same offshore company as Joan Pau Miquel
 Javier del Valle Petersfeld, Spanish lawyer and tax consultant, imputed in the Gürtel case
 Pretus Becerra, Spanish lawyer and executive of Bufete G. Petreus
 Javier Sanchís (CEO), Ana Isabel (Product responsible), Francisco Ruano Martín (Expansion responsible): leaders executives of Multiopticas.
 Jordi Mirarnau Banús, former CEO of COMSA.
 Josep Maria Torrens, CEO of Petromiralles and former mayor of Santa Maria de Miralles.
 Jordi Robinat, developer.
 Puig family, owners of Flamagas.
 Rodés family, industry business family.
 Sarasola Marulanda family.
 Francisco Ortiz von Bismarck, economist and businessman. Son of Gunilla von Bismarck, descendants of Otto von Bismarck.
 Miguel Ángel Marcano, consultant of Abanca Holdings.
 Luis Pineda, CEO of Ausbanc.
 Carlos Cassina, businessman.
 José María Caballé, Servigroup owner, the largest hotel chain in Benidorm.
 Javier Merino, businessman, ex-husband of Mar flores, Spanish actress and former model.
 Fernando Maria Masaveu, businessman and member of the richest asturian family.
 Jesús Ger, owner of Marina d'Or, which built a large complex of luxury hotels in Oropesa de Mar.
 José Antonio Corrales, lawyer and president of the YMCA Spanish branch.

 Tsai Ying-yang, older brother of president of Taiwan Tsai Ing-wen

Arron Banks, British political donor to the Tories and UKIP
 David and Frederick Barclay, British retail and media moguls
 Rocco Forte, British hotelier
 Peter Goldstein, British co-founder of Superdrug
 Lady Maureen Mills, entrepreneur and wife of Keith Mills
 Stuart Thomson Gulliver, British banking business executive, CEO of HSBC
 Anthony Gumbiner, British businessman, chairman of Hallman Group
 John Jennings, former chairman of Shell
 Sergei Kurzin, British-Russian oil and uranium business manager
 Rev. Peter Stephen John MacArthur (British entrepreneur), former operating officer and shareholder of KTTM Geophysics Ltd.
 Soulieman Marouf, British-Syrian businessman
 Heather Mills, British entrepreneur and environmentalist
 Richard Morris, British industrialist
 Nigel Rudd, British businessman

 Sanford I. Weill, when he was CEO of Citigroup, set up an offshore company for his yacht
 John E. Akridge III, a Washington real estate developer
 Harald Joachim von der Goltz, founder of Boston Capital Ventures
 Kjell Gunnar Finstad, Texas resident with an offshore oil business
 Igor Olenicoff, American billionaire
 Benjamin Wey, Chinese American financier, and president of New York Global Group
 Marianna Olszewski, American financial author and life coach
 Nakash family members
 Evan Kevin Martin, American sales consultant
 Candice Roa, Former Secretary of the American College Board up until late 2017

 Javier Bertucci, evangelical pastor, businessman and presidential candidate.

Other countries
  Ng Lap Seng, Macau-based real estate businessman
  Solomon Humes, Bahamian bishop of the Church of God of Prophecy
  Mohammed Faisal Karim Khan and Jafer Ummeed Khan, owners of Summit Group, the largest business family in Bangladesh 
  Omar Aggad, Saudi businessman and former director of Arab Palestinian Investment Company (APIC), and his son Tarek Aggad, current chairman, CEO and owner of 27% of the company
  Richard Attias, Moroccan businessman and husband of Cecilia Attias, former wife of French president Nicolas Sarkozy
  Ramón Navarro Pereira, Colombian executive of Canal de Isabel II
  Hollman Carranza, son of Colombian emerald mogul Víctor Carranza
  Ronald Chagoury, CEO of Nigerian construction company Chagoury Group.
   David Nahmad, Lebanese-Monegasque retired art dealer
  Glencore, Swiss company of formerly fugitive multinational hedge fund manager Marc Rich
  Goulandris family, Greek family with an important art collection
  Joan Pau Miquel i Prats, Andorran former CEO and current counselor of Banca Privada d'Andorra
   Ronald Grierson, German-born British banker
  Bert Meerstadt, board member of ABN-AMRO bank and former head of Dutch Railways
  Anders Wall, Swedish financier and former chairman of Volvo
  Roksanda Ilincic, Serbian fashion designer
  Patokh Chodiev, Uzbek billionaire, oligarch; and two of his relatives, Alexander Machkevitch and Alijan Ibragimov
   Frank Timiș, Romanian-born Australian businessman
  Francisco Serra-Martins, Australian businessman
  Olga Makarova, wife of Vladimir Peftiev, Belarusian businessman and rich oligarch.
  Marcela Dworzak Ibarcena, wife of Antonio Ibarcena Amico, former admiral of the Peruvian navy who was convicted of corruption and embezzlement for his role in military arms deals during the Alberto Fujimori regime.

Non-governmental organizations
  Gonzalo Delaveau, head of global corruption watchdog Transparency International's Chile branch (resigned 4 April 2016)

Organized crime 
  Marllory Chacón Rossell, Guatemalan drug trafficker
  Jorge Milton Cifuentes-Villa, Colombian drug trafficker, head of the Cifuentes-Villa Drug Trafficking Organization and partner of Chapo Guzmán
  Rafael Caro Quintero, Mexican drug trafficker and one of the founders of the now-disintegrated Guadalajara Cartel
  Iqbal Mirchi, right-hand man of India's most wanted criminal, Dawood Ibrahim
  Gordon Parry, property dealer who was laundering money from the Brink's-Mat robbery through a company called Feberion
  Gerardo González Valencia, suspected Mexican drug lord and money launderer; former member of the Jalisco New Generation Cartel (CJNG).
  Abigael González Valencia, suspected Mexican drug lord and money launderer; former leader of the CJNG.
  Nemesio Oseguera Cervantes, suspected Mexican drug lord and leader of the CJNG.

See also 
 List of people and organisations named in the Paradise Papers

References

External links 
 The list on the website of International Consortium of Investigative Journalists (US)
 The list on a world map by country
 Panama Leaks Pakistan List

Panama Papers